Controversy Sells is the second and final studio album by rappers Paul Wall and Chamillionaire. Paid In Full released the album in 2005 after both artists had left the label. The album peaked at #50 on the BillboardTop R&B/Hip-Hop Albums chart. There is a chopped and screwed version by DJ Michael '5000' Watts for Swishahouse.

Track listing

References

2005 albums
Chamillionaire albums
Paul Wall albums
The Color Changin' Click albums